The 1938 San Diego State Aztecs football team represented San Diego State College during the 1938 college football season.

This was the last year San Diego State would compete in the Southern California Conference (SCC). The following year, the Aztecs and Santa Barbara State would leave the SCIAC and join Fresno State and San Jose State as charter members of the California Collegiate Athletic Association (CCAA). In the 13 years the Aztecs played in the SCIAC (1926–1938), they were conference champions twice (1936 & 1937).

The 1938 San Diego State team was led by head coach Leo Calland in his fourth season with the Aztecs. They played home games at Aztec Bowl in San Diego, California. The Aztecs finished the season with five wins, two losses and one tie (5–2–1, 3–1–1 SCIAC). Overall, the team outscored its opponents 82–69 for the season.

Schedule

Team players in the NFL
No San Diego State players were selected in the 1939 NFL Draft.

Notes

References

San Diego State
San Diego State Aztecs football seasons
San Diego State Aztecs football